Louis Stanfill (born May 30, 1985 in Sacramento, California) is an American rugby union player who currently plays for San Diego Legion in Major League Rugby (MLR). He previously played for the United States national team. He plays a back row at flanker or No. 8, and can also play lock.

Youth and college rugby
Stanfill began playing rugby in high school at Jesuit High School (Sacramento), where he led his school to a national semifinal appearance. Stanfill also played high school football, and was named Sacramento defensive player of the year in 2002.

Stanfill played his college rugby at Cal, where they won several national championships during his years there, and Stanfill was selected as an All-American.

Club rugby
Following college, Stanfill played in Australia with the Canberra Royals, before moving to Italy to play with Super 10 club Mogliano in Treviso.  At Mogliano he played the Number 8 position. For the 2012 Super League season Stanfill returned to the US to play for NYAC. Due to his strong play the team won the title, finishing the season undefeated. Stanfill was named MVP of the final.  Stanfill signed with the Vicenza Rangers rugby club in Italy for the Serie A 2012-13 season.
In 2019, Stanfill returned to compete in the second season of Major League Rugby for the San Diego Legion.

International
Stanfill made his international debut against  in May 2005, at the age of 19. Stanfill also scored a try against Uruguay in a 2009 qualifying match for the 2011 Rugby World Cup. Stanfill also played at the 2011 Rugby World Cup, where he started 3 matches, and co-lead the team in tackles in the USA's matches against Ireland (11 tackles) and Russia (9 tackles). Stanfill finished his career competing in the 2015 Rugby World Cup in England, starting for the Eagles against heavy favorites South Africa in Olympic Stadium. Louis finished his career with 56 caps, 6th most in USA Rugby history.

Personal
Stanfill was diagnosed with Hodgkin's lymphoma in November 2020.

See also
 United States national rugby union team
 United States at the Rugby World Cup

References

External links
 Info at usarugby.com
 Stats at scrum.com

American rugby union players
1985 births
Living people
Rugby union props
United States international rugby union players
Austin Gilgronis players
San Diego Legion players
Sportspeople from Sacramento, California